This article lists government ministers who served under Prime Minister Margaret Thatcher. She was Prime Minister from 1979 to 1990, during which time she led a Conservative majority government and was the first woman to hold the office.

During her premiership, Thatcher retained the Falkland Islands, moved to liberalise the British economy through deregulation, privatisation, introducing the Right to Buy, through lower taxation and the promotion of entrepreneurialism.

Ministers

Cabinets

May 1979 to September 1981

September 1981 to June 1983

June 1983 to June 1987

June 1987 to July 1989

July 1989 to November 1990

Notes

References

History of the Conservative Party (UK)
Ministers
Lists of politicians from the United Kingdom
1980s politics-related lists